Schoolgirls (also known as The Girls) is a 2020 Spanish coming-of-age drama film written and directed by Pilar Palomero, starring Andrea Fandos and Natalia de Molina. 

The film won the Goya Award for Best Film, along with Best New Director and Best Original Screenplay for Palomero, and Best Cinematography for Daniela Cajías, from a total of nine nominations, at the 35th Goya Awards. Cajías became the first woman to win the Cinematography Goya. At the 8th Feroz Awards, the film won Best Drama Film, Best Director and Best Screenplay from a total of six nominations.

Plot 
Celia, an 11-year-old girl, studies at a nuns' school in Spain in 1992. Celia is a good girl: a responsible student and a considerate daughter. The arrival of a new classmate opens a small window through which Celia discovers a whole new world. Together with her new friend and some older girls, Celia enters a new stage of her life: adolescence, a period of firsts. She feels the need to experiment, try new things, and stop being a little girl, even if that entails confronting her mother and everything that once meant comfort and security.

Cast

Reception
Schoolgirls received positive reviews from film critics. It holds a 90% approval rating on review aggregator website Rotten Tomatoes based on 10 reviews, with an average rating of 8.1/10.

Awards
Schoolgirls won the Jury Prize in Directors' Week at the 2020 Brussels International Film Festival (BRIFF).

See also 
 List of Spanish films of 2020

References

External links
 
 

2020 films
2020s Spanish-language films
Spanish coming-of-age drama films
Films set in the 1990s
Films set in 1992
Best Film Goya Award winners
2020s coming-of-age drama films
2020 drama films

Films about puberty
2020s Spanish films
2020 directorial debut films